Joseph Edwin Washington (November 10, 1851 – August 28, 1915) was an American politician and a member of the United States House of Representatives for the 6th congressional district of Tennessee.

Early life
Washington was born on November 10, 1851 on his family tobacco plantation, Wessyngton, near Cedar Hill, Tennessee in Robertson County. His father, George Augustine Washington, was a planter and major slaveholder, a director of the Louisville and Nashville Railroad and the Nashville and Chattanooga Railroad, and a member of the Tennessee General Assembly from 1873 to 1875.

Washington received his early instruction at home and graduated from Georgetown College in Washington, D.C. on June 26, 1873. He studied law with the first law class organized at Vanderbilt University in Nashville, Tennessee in 1874. He was admitted to the bar, but never practiced. He took over management of Wessyngton Plantation and entered politics.

Career
From 1877 to 1879 Washington was a member of the Tennessee House of Representatives. In 1886 he was elected as a Democrat to the Fiftieth United States Congress, and was re-elected to the four succeeding Congresses. He served from March 4, 1887 to March 3, 1897, but he was not a candidate for renomination in 1896. He was the chairman of the United States House Committee on Territories during the Fifty-second Congress.

Appointed road commissioner, Washington had charge of the road construction work of Robertson County. He was a member of the Board of Trustees of Vanderbilt University and a director of the Nashville, Chattanooga & St. Louis and Nashville & Decatur Railroads. He resumed agricultural pursuits, managing the family's tobacco plantation, Wessyngton, in Robertson County, Tennessee.

Personal life and death
Washington married Mary Bolling Kemp and they had four children, George, Anne, Joseph, and Elizabeth.

Washington died on August 28, 1915, (aged 63) on the family estate. He is interred at the family burying ground on his estate.

References

External links

 

1851 births
1915 deaths
People from Robertson County, Tennessee
Democratic Party members of the Tennessee House of Representatives
Democratic Party members of the United States House of Representatives from Tennessee
19th-century American politicians
Vanderbilt University alumni
Georgetown College (Georgetown University) alumni
19th-century American businesspeople